Exotic Fever Records is an independent record label founded by Bonnie Schlegel in 2000 in the Washington, DC metropolitan area. Schlegel, formerly of the band Bald Rapunzel, enlisted the help of drummer Katy Otto in running the label. Currently operated by Otto in Philadelphia, bands have included The Shondes, Pygmylush, and 1905, which released their only album on the label. To date, the label has issued over 50 releases, including an array of benefit compilations such as Keep Singing! A Benefit Compilation for Compassion Over Killing.

History
Exotic Fever Records was founded in 2000 by Bonnie Schlegel, a punk musician living in Washington, DC. Then a member of Bald Rapunzel (Dischord Records) and living in the Luzon House with other musicians, she was encouraged by bandmate Clark Sabine to form the label to release music from his band The Halo Project. Schlegel chose the name to project the idea that the label was home to "rare and infectious music," and started with a small catalog of records she was interested in, releasing "100 CDR copies each with cute packaging. It wasn’t very serious."

She soon recruited the drummer of Bald Rapunzel, Katy Otto, to join in managing to the label. They  funded early releases with their personal work savings.

At the time Otto was roommates with Sara Klemm, who was organizing a compilation CD to benefit the DC Books to Prisons chapter she'd founded. The ensuing Literacy and Justice For All was the label's third release and first compilation. It included a zine with essays and prisoners' artwork, and proceeds from the album and live shows benefited DC Books to Prisons.

According to Klemm, "at least in the late '90s and early aughts, the D.C. music community was pretty special in how...it supported other non-music related projects. [The D.C. Area Books to Prisons Project] really benefited from the tremendous support we got from the DIY musicians in the city—both in terms of encouragement and financial support from benefit shows."

The label released the singular recording of influential DC band 1905 in 2004, which went on to be one of their best-selling releases. More releases and compilations followed.

Bonnie Schlegel left the label not long after its inception, moving to Vermont to raise her daughter and work on her solo project, Edie Moss. Back in DC, Otto brought Sara Klemm in to help with the label. While not a musician, Klemm regularly worked with musicians for charity work. Klemm and Otto and became partners at the label, with Otto later taking over as they relocated to South Philadelphia.

In 2009 the label released a split LP between Washington, DC's Turboslut and Pygmy Lush, and the next year partnered with The Shondes to release Searchlights, the band's third full length. In 2011, the label released Improvised Weapons by the Baltimore band War on Women, as well as a concept EP The Animals of Ambivalence. In 2013, Exotic Fever released the self-titled debut of from Berlin The Dropout Patrol. A host of other releases continued, both in physical and in digital format. In 2013, The Shondes released The Garden, their second venture on the label. They followed this up in 2016 with Brighton, and a digital version of Brighton B-sides.

In 2016, Exotic Fever Records released a double LP from Ghastly City Sleep, featuring ex-members of City of Caterpillar, entitled Lulling Skulls. In this year, the label also released a split LP with RedRumsey (Vern Rumsey from Unwound in a solo endeavor/project, and Teach Me Equals.

In March 2017, it was announced that the label would be releasing new projects in the summer from Cool Moon (ex-Del Cielo) and Fine Motor. In 2020, the label also announced the addition of Rainbow Crimes, Otto's new band with Leah Basarab and Alex Smith. Also in 2020, the label celebrated its 20th anniversary with a virtual concert featuring Exotic Fever Records' artists raising money for Black and Brown Workers Cooperative. In 2021, the label also held a virtual showcase organized with Cool Moon's Andrea Lisi to raise money for The Tea Fund in response to attacks on access to safe and legal abortion in Texas, where Lisi lives.

In 2020, in the midst of the coronovirus pandemic, Exotic Fever Records moved its planned twentieth anniversary showcase from an in person event to a virtual showcase. It streamed live and was later shared on Youtube. Additionally, the label offered tote bags and t-shirts to commemorate twenty years, along with the debut of a brand new logo.

Activism
Seminal D.C. punk and post-hardcore label Dischord Records handled early distribution, and their politically active nature was a significant influence on the label itself, as were DeSoto Records and SimpleMachines. Other early mentors and associates of the label included Brian Lowit of Lovitt Records, and according to Otto, "I will remain endlessly inspired till I die by the political and cultural work Fugazi did. They definitely changed my life and I attribute a lot of what I do today to the effect they had on me as a younger girl going to shows."

The label continues to focus on artists interested in social change and community, and is active politically. As part of their work with Positive Force DC, the label was also involved in the project All Our Power, a three-day gathering concerned with connecting punk and activism. Through fundraising through compilations and other means, as of 2013 it supports groups such as:
AMP (All Ages Movement Project)
Compassion Over Killing
DC Books to Prisons Project
District Alliance for Safe Housing
Helping Individual Prostitutes Survive
Men Can Stop Rape
Positive Force DC
Provisions Library
Vietnam Veterans of America

Benefit compilations
As of 2013 the label has released five compilations albums benefiting Vietnam Veterans of America, Helping Individual Prostitutes Survive, District Alliance for Safe Housing, the non-profit animal rights advocacy group Compassion Over Killing, and DC Books to Prisons.

On January 29, 2008, the label released Keep Singing! A Benefit Compilation for Compassion Over Killing. Genres on the compilation included Indie rock, alternative rock, emo, screamo, hardcore punk, punk, and post hardcore. The CD booklet contained vegetarian recipes submitted by the artists, and advertisements for small, ethical companies.

Keep Singing! was positively received, and according to a review: "Ranging from warm acoustic ballads to intense punk rock chops, each musician sings intelligent lyrics from the heart. There is no mistaking the messages of compassion and animal rights in this album. Keep Singing! offers a breath of fresh air to thinking people sadly wandering amidst vapid pop star-worship and destruction of the planet’s resources."

A 2013 compilation of The Others discography benefited To Write Love on Her Arms, a suicide-prevention non-profit that is primarily supported though bands and musicians.

Artists

While many releases are punk or post-punk, the label is not associated with one particular genre. According to Otto, "We like to release music we think is incredible, by people we think are exceptional, who are interested...in being part of a cultural community." Also, "in our opinion, [the bands] all make sense aesthetically together - while they may sound totally different, they come from the same place of urgency."

Owner Katy Otto drums or has drummed for a number of bands, including Del Cielo, Trophy Wife, The Lonely American, Homage to Catalonia, Problems, Helsinki, Callowhill, and Rainbow Crimes. Animals of Ambivalence and The Monsters in My Bed are her concept EPs. Most of her bands have released music on the label, although frequently with dual releases on other labels such as Eyeball Records. According to Otto, the bands tend to make better group decisions when working neutrally with a third-party label, as compared to one member owning the label themselves. Trophy Wife, for example, is on 307 Knox Records for this reason.

They've also done split releases with Golden Brown Records (Philadelphia) and Altin Village Records (Germany).

Current

A Stick and a Stone
Animals of Ambivalence
Callowhill
Cool Moon
Dropout Patrol
Fine Motor
Ghastly City Sleep
Kathy Cashel
M.G. Lederman
The Monsters in My Bed
Pygmylush
RedRumsey (Vern Rumsey)
The Shondes
Teach Me Equals
Trophy Wife
Upholstery
War on Women

Past

1905
Andrea Lisi
Bellafea
Del Cielo
Den of Thieves
des ark
Eulcid
Exholiday
Ricky Fitts
Halflight
The Halo Project
Homage to Catalonia
Hope and Anchor
Life at These Speeds
Light the Fuse and Run
Liza Kate
The Lonely American
Mass Movement of the Moth
New Idea Society
Now Sleepyhead
The Others
Pash
polarOPPOSITEbear
Rachel Jacobs
Rainbow Crimes
Resin Hits
Resister
Respira
The Sinister Quarter
Songs of August
Thank God
Tight Phantomz
tornavalanche
Turboslut
Ultra Dolphins
Van Johnson
Wrong Day to Quit
Gina Young

Discography

References

Further reading
 Interview with Katy Otto, ScenpointBlank
 D.C. Superhero: An Interview with Katy Otto, Clamor Magazine (2005)
 Interview with Katy Otto, Silbermedia (2010)

External links
 

2000 establishments in Washington, D.C.
American independent record labels
Record labels established in 2001